A Flying circus is a barnstorming troop (a flying exhibition team).

Flying circus or Flying Circus may also refer to:
 The Flying Circus (band), an Australian country rock/pop band (1968–74) 
 The Flying Circus (Canada), a short-lived Canadian folk rock band (1967–1968)
 The Flying Circus of Physics, a collection of physics problems by Jearl Walker first published in 1975
 Cobham's Flying Circus, an English flying circus (barnstorming group) started by Alan Cobham in 1932
 Monty Python's Flying Circus, a British television sketch comedy originally broadcast 1969–1974
 Flying Circus, an American World War II air corps led by Joe Foss
 Pussy Galore's Flying Circus in James Bond movie  Goldfinger
 Circo Voador, in Portuguese, a concert venue in Rio de Janeiro

See also
 Jagdgeschwader 1 (World War I), a German World War I fighter wing, commanded at one point by Manfred von Richthofen (the "Red Baron")